Gyeongnam may refer to:  

Gyeongsangnam-do, a province in the southeast of South Korea
Gyeongnam FC, a South Korean soccer club based in the Gyeongsangnam-do province
Gyeongnam Ilbo, is one of the two daily newspapers serving in Gyeongsangnam-do province